Sporting Club de Draguignan is a French football team based in Draguignan. They competed in the Coupe de France round of 32 in 1950–51, 1952–53, 1954–55, and the round of 16 in 1958–59.

Former players

References

 
1941 establishments in France
Association football clubs established in 1941
Sport in Var (department)
Football clubs in Provence-Alpes-Côte d'Azur